Doctor in the House is the American collective name for seven separate British and Australian television comedy series inspired by a series of cinema films, which in turn were based on and inspired by a series of books by Richard Gordon, about the misadventures of a group of medical students — and their later misadventures as doctors.

The first five series, Doctor in the House, Doctor at Large, Doctor in Charge, Doctor at Sea and Doctor on the Go, were produced by London Weekend Television between 1969 and 1977.

The sixth series, Doctor Down Under, which was filmed and based in Australia, was produced by Australia's Seven Network in 1979.

The final series, Doctor at the Top, was produced by the British Broadcasting Corporation in 1991.

The same theme music — "Bond Street Parade" by Alan Tew — was used for all of the "Doctor" television series, including the Australian series Doctor Down Under.

Plot 
The plot revolved around the trials of medical students at St Swithin's hospital in London.

Characters 
The television series would employ a set of characters completely different from the original book series (the film and radio series would use the characters from the books).

The major protagonists were:
Michael Upton (Barry Evans), an easy-going, serious and somewhat anxious son of a doctor who is essentially following in his father's footsteps.
Duncan Waring (Robin Nedwell), Michael's best friend and roommate.  He is just as bright as Upton, but far less serious in his studies, although he generally does well.  After Barry Evans left the show, Nedwell returned as Waring to become the focus of the show.
Paul Collier (George Layton), a less competent student and friend of Upton and Waring.
Dick Stuart-Clark (Geoffrey Davies), a thirtyish student who deliberately fails his courses in order to take advantage of his late grandmother's will, which bequeathed him a large sum of money for each year he is in medical school. Stuart-Clark is the only character present throughout all seven series.
Lawrence Bingham (Richard O'Sullivan), a brilliant, but arrogant and irritating doctor who believes he is the best of all possible doctors.  He marries the equally obnoxious Dr. Mary Parsons (Helen Fraser) in the series Doctor in Charge. His need to continually impress her is the source of much comedy.

The main antagonist is the well-respected and ill-tempered surgeon Professor (later Sir) Geoffrey Loftus (Ernest Clark). Most of the plot lines revolve around the students' attempts to meet his demanding expectations.

Another hospital official with whom the students have contact is the Dean (Ralph Michael), who is more interested in the hospital's Rugby union team than he is in medicine.

Other characters in the early episodes, some of whom later reappeared for single episodes in subsequent series, include:
 Danny Hooley (Jonathan Lynn), an Irish medical student who is a friend of Waring, Collier, Upton and Stuart-Clark. He later returns as an 'out-of-work doctor' in the Doctor in Charge episode "Should Auld Acquaintance be Forgot?"
 Huw Evans (Martin Shaw), a Welsh medical student, another friend of the four students.  He reappears as a very nervous expectant father in the episode "Mother and Father Doing Well".
 Dave Briddock (Simon Cuff), another friend of the students. He spends part of the series living with Helga, his Swedish girlfriend.

Guest stars
Notable guest stars throughout the run of the series and its sequels included:

Hattie Jacques, Mollie Sugden, Roy Kinnear, Maureen Lipman, Patricia Routledge, Graeme Garden, David Jason, John Le Mesurier, Arthur Lowe, Angela Scoular, Tessa Wyatt and John Bluthal.

Series 
 Doctor in the House — (1969–1970) — London Weekend Television (LWT)
 First series (13 episodes) broadcast from 12 July to 4 October 1969
 Second series (13 episodes) broadcast from 10 April to 3 July 1970
 Doctor at Large — (1971) — LWT
 Third series (29 episodes) broadcast from 28 February to 12 September 1971
 Doctor in Charge — (1972–1973) — LWT
 Fourth series (27 episodes) broadcast from 9 April to 8 October 1972
 Fifth series (16 episodes) broadcast from 15 September to 29 December 1973
 Doctor at Sea — (1974) — LWT
 Sixth series (13 episodes) broadcast from 21 April to 14 July 1974
 Doctor on the Go — (1975–1977) — LWT
 Seventh series (13 episodes) broadcast from 27 April to 20 July 1975
 Eighth series (13 episodes) broadcast from 16 January to 10 April 1977
 Doctor Down Under — (1979) — Seven Network (Australia)
 Ninth series (13 episodes) broadcast from 12 February 1979 to 10 May 1979
 Doctor at the Top — (1991) — BBC
 Tenth series (7 episodes) broadcast from 21 February to 4 April 1991

Writers 
Unusually for a British situation comedy series Doctor in the House did not depend on a single writer or partnership to write the scripts. The writers who worked on the series are often better known for their other work. Monty Python's Graham Chapman and John Cleese and The Goodies Graeme Garden and Bill Oddie were among the regular writers. Chapman and Garden both trained as doctors. Graeme Garden also appeared as a "Television Presenter" in the episode "Doctor on the Box".

While keeping mostly to the conventions of the situation comedy genre, the shows occasionally stretched the boundaries of what was seen on television. One script by Cleese called for Michael Upton to rip away a woman's dress in a single movement (she was hiding a key he needed in her cleavage). Another featured a stripper collapsing on stage mid-act with suspected pneumonia. A script by Garden and Oddie included a scene played out using cartoon drawings of the performers, in the style of a teenage romance magazine, while the actors voiced their lines.

Location of St. Swithin's Hospital 
The building used as the fictional St. Swithin's Hospital is, in fact, the old Wanstead Hospital (based in Wanstead, London, E11). A number of years ago it was converted into a residential building and is now called Clock Court. It is a listed building based on Hermon Hill, within the London Borough of Redbridge. Before becoming a hospital it was an orphanage for children whose parents were lost at sea, and the architecture of the building depicts images of boats carved into the intricate stone. A number of celebrities are rumoured to have lived there over the years including the actor Gary Lucy (The Bill), and Heart FM radio DJ Paul Hollins.

International telecasts

Australia 
The show proved to be very popular in Australia, where the series Doctor Down Under was filmed and based.

North America 
From about 1971 to 1974 the program was syndicated in the United States and Canada by Group W Productions.  The umbrella title Doctor in the House was used for all shows, and episodes from different series were sometimes shown out of sequence. The program briefly reappeared in US syndication in the 1980s, airing both episodes seen in its original US run and ones from later series.

Notes
British doctors study medicine at the undergraduate level, so the characters were new to independent living and university life.

Ernest Clark, who played the part of Professor Loftus in the television series, also appeared in the original film version of Doctor in the House.  He also played the part of Prof. Sir Loftus' identical twin brother, Capt. Norman Loftus, heading the cruise ship in Doctor at Sea.

External links

First-run syndicated television programs in the United States
ITV sitcoms
 
English-language television shows